Doctor at Sea is a British television comedy series based on a set of books by Richard Gordon about the misadventures of doctors at sea. The series followed directly from its predecessor Doctor in Charge, and was produced by London Weekend Television in 1974.

Although each of its predecessors had long runs, Doctor at Sea was limited to a single series of thirteen episodes. It has been suggested that only one series was to be produced as costs for this series were a lot higher than previous programmes.

Writers for the Doctor at Sea episodes were Richard Laing, George Layton, Jonathan Lynn, Bernard McKenna, Gail Renard and Phil Redmond.

Cast
 Robin Nedwell - Dr Duncan Waring
 Geoffrey Davies - Dr Dick Stuart-Clark
 Ernest Clark - Captain Norman Loftus, brother of Sir Geoffrey Loftus in the other series, also played by Ernest Clark
 John Grieve - Purser
 Elizabeth Counsell - Nurse Joyce Wynton

Episodes
 "Sir John and Baby Doc"
 "Oh I Do Like to Be Beside the Sea Sick"
 "A Healthy Ship is a Happy Ship"
 "The Senior Officer's Perks"
 "Go Away Stowaway!"
 "Floating Profits"
 "Goodbye Mr. Ships!"
 "The V.I.P."
 "In a Little Spanish Town"
 "Physician, Heal Thyself"
 "A Wolf in Ship's Clothing"
 "Murder! He Said"
 "But It's So Much Nicer to Come Home"

References

External links
Doctor at Sea at British TV Comedy Guide
Doctor at Sea at BingeClock
Doctor at Sea at Nostalgia Central

1974 British television series debuts
1974 British television series endings
1970s British sitcoms
Doctor in the House
English-language television shows
First-run syndicated television programs in the United States
1970s British medical television series
ITV sitcoms
Television shows set in London
Television series by ITV Studios
London Weekend Television shows
Live action television shows based on films